Dai Rao (born 2 April 1972) is a Chinese singer and actress.

Early life and education
Dai was born in Beijing on April 2, 1972. Her parents divorced in 1980, when she was 8. In October 1993, she entered Beijing Dance Academy.

Career
Dai's debut solo album, Close to You, Gently Say Love You, was released in April 1994. In March 1995, she held a solo concert in Japan.

On 15 February 1991, she performed at the CCTV New's Eve on China Central Television.

Her 4th album, titled Perfect Thing, was released in May 2004.

Her 5th album, titled Blooming, was released in August 2006.

In February 2009, she released her 6th album Love Tips.

Personal life
Dai married on July 10, 2010 in Beijing. She has two children.

Discography

Studio album

Filmography

Television series

References

1972 births
Living people
21st-century Chinese actresses
Actresses from Beijing
Singers from Beijing
Beijing Dance Academy alumni
Chinese Mandopop singers
Chinese television actresses
21st-century Chinese women singers